The Kacchi Dargah–Bidupur Bridge, currently under construction, will span the river Ganges, connecting Kacchi Dargah in Patna and Bidupur in Hajipur in the Indian state of Bihar. Upon completion in 2023, the bridge will provide an easy roadway link between the northern and southern parts of Bihar and will connect two major national highways, linking NH 31 to NH 322.

The project
Chief minister Nitish Kumar inaugurated the construction of the  bridge in August, 2015. Upon completion in July 2023, the bridge will reduce the load on Mahatma Gandhi Setu and will also reduce the traffic in the capital city of Patna. The concrete-laying in a well foundation starting on 19 July 2017 on the Raghopur side. 67 well foundations would be constructed in Ganga while total 20 well foundations will be laid in 'Diyara' area of both sides of Ganga. A JV of Daewoo E&C from Korea with Indian homegrown major L&T Construction is executing the Rs 3,115 crore  bridge project which will be the longest bridge in India.

A bridge has been planned across the Ganges to connect Arrah and Chhapra. A road bridge parallel to the existing rail and road  bridge, Rajendra Setu, has also been planned.

Construction of contacted highway
6 Major junction 
1 Grade Separater 
4 Two lane loops
8 Ramps 
2 Flyover 
6 Viaduct 
2 Rotary
3 Bus Stop
1 museum

Highlight
First bridge of Bihar to be a 6 lane extradosed bridge
Longest bridge of India on river
Six lane highspeed corridor
All span navigational

Advantages
The bridge will be a major connecting bridge between North and South Bihar
The work of external ring road of Patna
It will connect national highways 31 and 322

See also
 Raghopur, Vaishali
 
 Digha–Sonpur Bridge
 Loknayak Ganga Path

References

Extradosed bridges
Extradosed bridges in India
Bridges over the Ganges
Bridges in Bihar
Vaishali district
Transport in Patna
Transport in Hajipur